Marcel De Corte (25 November 1929 – 27 February 2017) was a Belgian footballer who played as an inside forward and winger.

Career
Born in Sint-Truiden, De Corte played club football for RC Gand, Anderlecht, CS Léopoldville, ARA La Gantoise, KSV Waregem and Charleroi.

He made three appearances for the Belgium national team in 1954.

Later life and death
De Corte died on 27 February 2017 at the age of 87.

References

1929 births
2017 deaths
Association football inside forwards
Association football wingers
Belgian footballers
R.S.C. Anderlecht players
K.A.A. Gent players
K.S.V. Waregem players
R. Charleroi S.C. players
Belgian Third Division players
Belgian Pro League players
Belgian expatriate footballers
Belgian expatriate sportspeople in the Democratic Republic of the Congo
Expatriate footballers in the Democratic Republic of the Congo
K.S.V. Waregem managers
Belgian football managers
Belgium international footballers
People from Sint-Truiden
Footballers from Limburg (Belgium)